The Project 205 Moskit (mosquito) more commonly known by their NATO reporting name Osa, are a class of missile boats developed for the Soviet Navy in the late 1950s. Until 1962 this was classified as a large torpedo boat.

The Osa class is probably the most numerous class of missile boats ever built, with over 400 vessels constructed between 1960 and 1973 for both the Soviet Navy and for export to allied countries. Osa means wasp in Russian, but it is not an official name. The boats were designated as "large missile cutters" in the Soviet Navy.

Origins
While the earlier Komar class were cheap and efficient boats (and the first to sink a warship with guided missiles, destroying the Israeli Navy's Eilat), their endurance, sea keeping, and habitability were modest at best, and the missile box was vulnerable to damage from waves. Among their other weak points were the wooden hull, the radar set lacking a fire control unit, and an inadequate defensive armament consisting of two manually operated 25 mm guns with only a simple optical sight in a single turret.

The Komars' offensive weapons were a pair of P-15 Termit (NATO: SS-N-2 "Styx") missiles, and there was insufficient capacity to hold the more modern longer-ranged P-15Ms. The sensors were not effective enough to use the maximum range of the missiles, and the crew of 17 was not large enough to employ all the systems efficiently.

In order to remedy all these shortcomings, it was felt that bigger boats were needed to mount the necessary equipment and to provide more space for a larger crew.

Project
The Project 205 boats are bigger than the pioneering Project 183R (NATO: Komar class) boats, with a mass four times greater, and nearly double the crew. They were still meant to be 'minimal' ships for the planned tasks.

The hull was made of steel, with a low and wide superstructure made of lighter AMG alloys, continuous deck, and a high free-board. The edges of the deck were rounded and smooth to ease washing off radioactive contamination in case of nuclear war. The hull was quite wide, but the Project 205 boats could still achieve high speeds as they had three Zvezda M503 radial diesel engines capable of a combined 12,000 hp (15,000 hp on Project 205U onward) driving three shafts.

The powerful engines allowed a maximum speed of about 40 knots together with reasonable endurance and reliability. There were also three diesel generators. Two main engines and one generator were placed in the forward engine room, the third main engine and two generators in the aft engine room. There was a control compartment between the two engine rooms.

The problem related to the weak anti-aircraft weaponry of the earlier Project 183R was partially solved with the use of two AK-230 turrets, in the fore and aft deck. An MR-104 Rys (NATO: "Drum Tilt") fire-control radar was placed in a high platform, and controlled the whole horizon, despite the superstructures that were quite wide but low. Even if placed in the aft, this radar had a good field of view all around.

The AK-230 turrets were unmanned, each armed with two 30 mm guns capable of firing 2,000 rpm (400 practical) with a 2,500 m practical range. Use against surface targets was possible, but as with the previous Komar ships, once all missiles were expended it was planned to escape and not fight. Truly effective anti-surface gun weaponry was not available until the introduction of the Project 12341.1 Molniya (NATO: "Tarantul") class corvettes, with 76 mm guns.

The offensive armament consisted of four P-15 Termit (NATO: SS-N-2 "Styx") missiles, each protected from bad weather conditions inside an enclosing box-shaped launcher. This doubled the available weapons compared to the Project 183R, giving greater endurance. The missiles were controlled by a MR-331 Rangout (NATO: "Top Bow") radar and a Nikhrom-RRM (NATO: "Square Tie") ESM/IFF that even allowed targeting over the horizon, if the target's radar was turned on.

With all these improvements, these ships were considerably more effective. They had one of the first, if not the first close-in weapon systems (CIWS). The survivability rating was improved to 50%, and the required volley of 12 missiles could be launched by only three ships. Sinking a destroyer was therefore regarded as 'assured' using only six ships (two squadrons of three vessels), making the Project 205 vessels easier to coordinate and even cheaper than would be the required number of Project 183R boats to achieve the same effectiveness.

As a result of these improvements, Project 205 boats were without equal in the late 1950/early 1960s. Over 400 were made in USSR, and another 120 in China. Some of the improved Project 205U (Osa II) were equipped with the 9K32 Strela-2 (NATO: SA-N-5 "Grail") surface-to-air missiles in MTU-4 quadruple launchers in an attempt to improve air defence. This new model also had improved, more powerful engines, and new cylindrical missile boxes, with the improved P-15U missiles. The later 205M and 205 mod boats had longer tubes for the further-improved P-15M missiles.

Variants
The Project 205's hull proved to be very versatile and were used as the basis for a whole series of Soviet fast attack craft and patrol boats.
 Project 205 ("Osa I"): Original missile boat, recognisable by the box-shaped missile launchers for the P-15/P-15T Termit missiles. 160 built.
 Project 205Ch: Project 205 with electric equipment on 400 Hz. 1 built.
 Project 205U ("Osa II"): Upgraded Project 205 with tube-shaped missile launchers for the improved P-15U missile. 32 built.
 Project 205ER: Main export version of the Project 205U. Nikhrom-RRM IFF/ESM, Nickel IFF, and ARP-58SV radio direction finder removed.
 Project 205M: Longer missile tubes for P-15M missiles with new Graviy radar complex instead of Rangout/Rys complex. 1 built.
 Project 205mod: P-15M missile instead of P-15U. 19 built.
 Project 205P Tarantul ("Stenka"): Anti-submarine patrol boat version.

In addition to the above, the Project 206 family of fast attack craft (NATO: Shershen, Turya, and Matka class) are based on the Project 205 and share a common engine room design.

Combat service
These missile boats saw action during the War of Attrition, Yom Kippur War, and Indo-Pakistani War of 1971.

The Israeli Saar missile-boats sank a Syrian Osa class missile-boat during the Battle of Latakia and three Egyptian Osa class missile-boats in the Battle of Baltim. No Israeli ships were damaged in these battles.

In contrast, the Indian Navy Osa missile-boats were very successful against the Pakistani Navy in Operation Trident, with a total of five ships sunk, two damaged beyond repair, an oil facility destroyed and Karachi Port held under blockade for no losses.

Osas were also used in the Iran–Iraq War, with few losses, especially in a single battle in 1980 when several were destroyed by F-4s with AGM-65s. This battle occurred on 29 November 1980 and the Iraqi Navy incurred some damage. Iraq has lost only five missile boats during the eight years of war.

Syrian Osa II's have been used in the Syrian Civil War. Osa IIs were filmed firing their deck guns into the city of Latakia.

The shortcomings that the export Osas had were mainly the low efficiency of their missiles against small and ECM-equipped targets, as seen in the Battle of Latakia. In this conflict, Osas and Komars fired first, thanks to the longer range of missiles and favourable radar propagation conditions, but missed the targets due to jamming, and were not capable of escaping due to some engine malfunctions. The lack of medium caliber gun hampered defence against gunboats, even though the USSR had 37, 45 and 57 mm guns capable of being fitted in place of one 30 mm gun, as happened in some other vessels, such as the Poti ASW corvettes. Effective anti-missile systems were never equipped even though there was no significant size or weight difference between the AK-230 and the AK-630 CIWS.

The successor was the Project 1241 Tarantul class corvette, with twice the displacement and a higher cost, but still initially armed with only four P-15s. They finally had a better electronic suite and a 76 mm gun with high rate of fire, along with newer P-270 Moskit and Kh-35 supersonic missiles, AK-630 CIWS, and 'Bass Tilt' radars. Fewer were built however, and so the Osas, after replacing the old Komars, remained widely in service up to the turn of the 21st century.

Operators
About 175 Osa I and 114 Osa II boats were built for the Soviet Navy, the last were decommissioned in about 1990 in the main Soviet fleet. Amongst the post-Soviet countries, one boat is in service with the Azerbaijan Navy and two are in service with the Latvian Navy.

Osa I

 Military of Benin – 2 boats in 1979
 Bangladesh Navy – 5 boats
 People's Liberation Army Navy – 4 boats in early 1960s plus over 130 license-produced.
 Egyptian Navy – 3 boats (plus two in reserve) remain  from 13 transferred from the Soviet Union in 1966–68, some of which were sunk during the Yom Kippur War in 1973. The survivors were re-engined in 1994 and given Litton Triton radar intercept systems. 5 ex-Yugoslav boats were bought in 2004 for less than $1m a piece, refitted in Montenegro and delivered in 2007.
 East German Navy – 15 boats transferred 1962–1971 – decommissioned 1981–1990
 Indian Navy – 9 boats transferred 1968-1971. Known as Vidyut-class missile boats. Decommissioned 1983–1997.
 Latvian Navy – 6 ex-East German boats, decommissioned during the 1990s.
 North Korean Navy – 12 boats transferred 1968–1973
 Polish Navy – 13 boats transferred 1964–1975 – decommissioned 1984–2006
 Romanian Navy – 6 boats in service 1964–2004
 Soviet Navy – Passed on to successor states
 Syrian Navy – 8 boats
 Yugoslav Navy – 10 boats
 Croatian navy – inherited 2 boats, one decommissioned during the 1990s, second used as a target boat for RBS-15 missiles.
 Military of Montenegro – Serbia-Montenegro sold 5 to Egypt in 2004, delivered in 2007.

Osa II

 Algerian Navy – 8 boats transferred 1978
 Angolan Navy – 6 boats transferred 1982–1983
 Azerbaijani Navy – 1 boat
 Bulgarian Navy – 3 boats
 Cuban Navy – 13 boats
 Egyptian Navy – 4 boats (See note from Finland's Tuima class missile boat)
 Eritrean Navy – 5 boats
 Finnish Navy – 4 boats transferred 1974–75. Known as Tuima class missile boats. Decommissioned in 2003 and sold to Egyptian Navy, to be used as minelaying boats after being retrofitted.
 Indian Navy – 8 boats transferred 1976–77. Known as Chamak-class missile boats. decommissioned 1999–2003
 Iraqi Navy – used during Operation Morvarid
 Libyan Navy – Unknown
 National Liberation Army – Unknown
 Russian Navy – Passed on from Soviet Navy
 Somali Navy – 2
 Soviet Navy – Passed on to successor states
 Syrian Navy - 12 boats
 Vietnamese Navy – 8 boats
 Yemeni Navy – 18 boats

See also
 List of ships of the Soviet Navy
 List of ships of Russia by project number

References

Notes

Bibliography

 Conway's All the World's Fighting Ships 1947–1995
 Page on Osa 2 from Indian Navy history
 Page on Osa 1 from Indian Navy history
 Trident and other operations in 1971 Indo-Pakistan war
 Slade, Stuart, "The true history of Soviet anti-ship missiles," RID magazine, May 1994.
 Shikavthecenko, V, "Lightings in the sea: the Russian FACs developments," RID September 1995.

External links
 Complete Ship List of all Osa class missile boats

Missile boat classes
Missile boats of the Soviet Navy
Missile boats of the Algerian National Navy
Missile boats of the Angolan Navy
Missile boats of the Azerbaijani Navy
Missile boats of the Benin Navy
Missile boats of the Bulgarian Navy
Missile boats of the Croatian Navy
Missile boats of the Cuban Navy
Missile boats of the Egyptian Navy
Missile boats of the Eritrean Navy
Missile boats of the Korean People's Navy
Missile boats of the Latvian Naval Forces
Missile boats of the Libyan Navy
Missile boats of the Montenegrin Navy
Missile boats of the People's Liberation Army Navy
Missile boats of the Polish Navy
Missile boats of the Romanian Naval Forces
Missile boats of the Yugoslav Navy
Missile boats of the Somali Navy
Missile boats of the South Yemen Navy
Missile boats of the Syrian Navy
Missile boats of the Vietnam People's Navy
Missile boats of the Volksmarine